"A Bathroom of Her Own" is a short story by Robert A. Heinlein about a political campaign in the U.S. after World War II. Written in 1946, it was unpublished until printed in Heinlein's Expanded Universe (1980). The story has no science fiction or fantasy elements.

Heinlein wrote in a foreword: "Any old pol will recognize the politics in this story as the Real McCoy.  Should be.  Autobiographical in many details.  Which details?  Show me a warrant and I'll take the Fifth".  Another political story of Heinlein's is "Our Fair City" (1949).  Heinlein had a cynical view of politics from his experiences on the Upton Sinclair 1934 campaign for Governor of California and his own at the receiving end of supposed dirty tricks during Heinlein's failed 1938 election campaign for the California State Assembly.

References

Short stories by Robert A. Heinlein
1980 short stories
1946 short stories
Historical short stories